John Anthony James O'Sullivan (born 18 September 1993) is an Irish professional footballer who plays as an attacking midfielder for Bohemians.

Club career
In the summer of 2009, O’Sullivan, aged 15, joined Premier League side Blackburn Rovers from Dublin-based Belvedere, a youth club that's well known for its youth system which has successfully produced dozens of players who have gone on to play football throughout the United Kingdom and Ireland.

Working his way through the ranks at Rovers, from the Academy to the Reserves, O’Sullivan begun to be featured in match day squads as an unused substitute during the 2012–13 Football League Championship campaign, the club's first season back in the second-tier of English football having been relegated from the Premier League in May 2012.

On 4 May 2013, O’Sullivan made his senior professional debut for Rovers in their final game of the season, coming on as a second-half substitute against Birmingham City.

On 9 January 2014, O'Sullivan joined Conference Premier side Southport on a one-month loan deal. On 2 February, the loan was extended until the end of the season. He scored his first goal for Southport on 22 February 2014 in a 3–1 away defeat against Forest Green Rovers.

On 19 September 2014, O'Sullivan joined League Two outfit Accrington Stanley on a one-month loan deal. On 20 October 2014, the loan was extended until 20 December 2014. O'Sullivan scored 4 goals in 13 appearances.

In January 2017, it was announced that O’Sullivan and Blackburn Rovers had agreed to mutually terminate the player's contract, ending his eight-year association with the Lancashire outfit. In total, O’Sullivan made six first-team appearances for Rovers, having spent a majority of his last three-years with the club out on-loan at Southport, Accrington Stanley, Barnsley, Rochdale and Bury.

In the same month, following his release from Blackburn Rovers, O’Sullivan signed for League Two side Carlisle United on an 18-month-deal. He was released by Carlisle at the end of the 2017-18 season, having made 35 league appearances for the Cumbrian club, finding the net on two occasions.

In June 2018, O’Sullivan linked up once again with former Rovers academy and first-team manager Gary Bowyer at League One Blackpool, signing a one-year-deal with the Tangerines.

On 4 September, O'Sullivan scored his first goal for Blackpool in a 3-3 draw against Macclesfield Town in the EFL Trophy.

In late January 2019, O’Sullivan, joined Scottish Premiership club Dundee on loan until the end-of-the-season. He left Blackpool at the end of the season, following the expiration of his contract with the Seasiders. Blackpool had opted against activating the clause in O'Sullivan's contract to extend his stay by a further year.

On 2 July 2019, O'Sullivan joined League Two outfit Morecambe, agreeing to a two-year-deal with the side.

On 17 June 2021, it was announced that O’Sullivan had agreed to join League One side Accrington Stanley on a three-year-deal upon the expiration of his contract with newly-promoted Morecambe, having turned down an offer from Morecambe to join rivals Stanley. It meant that the move was to be the first time O’Sullivan had linked up with Stanley on a permanent basis, having previously had two loan-spells with the club.

On June 10, 2022, John returned home to Dublin to sign for League of Ireland Premier Division side Bohemians.

International career
O'Sullivan made his debut for the Ireland national under 15 team in 2008, he won international u16 player of the year. He has been called up at all age groups to the Republic of Ireland U21s. In 2011, he featured in all the games for Ireland u19 team that reached the semi final of the euro finals.

Career statistics

Club

Honours

Morecambe
EFL League Two play-offs: 2021

References

External links

Blackburn Rovers Reserve team profile
Blackburn Rovers 1st team profile

1993 births
Living people
Association footballers from County Dublin
Association football midfielders
Republic of Ireland association footballers
Belvedere F.C. players
Blackburn Rovers F.C. players
Southport F.C. players
Accrington Stanley F.C. players
Barnsley F.C. players
Rochdale A.F.C. players
Bury F.C. players
Carlisle United F.C. players
Blackpool F.C. players
Dundee F.C. players
Morecambe F.C. players
Bohemian F.C. players
English Football League players
National League (English football) players
League of Ireland players
Republic of Ireland youth international footballers
Republic of Ireland under-21 international footballers
Scottish Professional Football League players
Republic of Ireland expatriate association footballers
Irish expatriate sportspeople in England
Expatriate footballers in England